Goffi is a surname. Notable people with the surname include:

Cesare Goffi (1920–1995), Italian footballer
Danilo Goffi (born 1972), Italian long-distance runner
Emmanuel Goffi (born 1971), French Air Force officer and writer
Nancy Augustyniak Goffi (born 1979), American soccer player
Sara Goffi (born 1981), Italian swimmer

Italian-language surnames